The Silambam Asia (SILA) (IAST: Silambam Āsiyā) is the official international body of Silambam for the Continent of Asia and a Non-Governmental Organization recognized by the World Silambam Association (WSA). On November 22, 1999, the primary name of Silambam, which originated from the ancient Tamil Nadu State of India, was documented by Guruji Murugan Chillayah to become the official organization name to provide Indian traditional arts and sports for education, health, fitness, culture, nature, climate change, recreation, and dissemination work. The primary name Silambam was legally registered and recognized as a formalized organization after receiving security clearance approval from the Regulatory Authority. It was followed by the formation of Silambam Asia, registered with members from twelve countries on the Asia continent and officially recognized by the United Nations, which has expanded and grown further throughout the Asia continent and worldwide. Silambam Asia (SILA) is in partnership with the United Nations Sustainable Development Goals to preserve and safeguard the Indian traditional arts, sports, cultural and educational content within Silambam at the regional or continental by the establishment of Silambam Asia with the Ministry of Home Affairs (JPPM) in Malaysia.

History
Silambam first gained international recognition when the United Nations Assembly Committee for Economic and Social Council recommended Silambam Asia for status during an event held at the United Nations headquarters in New York City, United States on January 21, 2019. On January 30, 2019 concluded substantive work as the Committee recommended Silambam Asia for status in the United Nations.

Mission and values

The mission of Silambam Asia as an umbrella organization of the World Silambam Association (WSA) to provide effective international governance by constantly improve technical rules and regulating Silambam competitions or participation in International events or sporting arena, to be recognized as an Olympic sport and Paralympic sport.

Silambam Asia also plays active roles as an international organization for governance and sustainable development on the Indian Traditional Martial Arts and Sports for Education, Health, Fitness, Culture, Nature, Climate Change, Recreational, and dissemination all these related information. Thus, the vital role to provide expertise for members by providing the Training, Research, Revive, Rejuvenate, Retention, and Restore.

By establishing Silambam in both traditional arts and modern sports games to group everyone collectively in similar activities, Silambam Asia aims to promote the sustainability for members and the members' visibility worldwide.

Competition and events
Most common domestic/international Silambam competition categories for practitioners.

See also

Angampora
Banshay
Bataireacht
Bōjutsu
Gatka
Jūkendō
Kalaripayattu
Kendo
Kenjutsu
Krabi–krabong
Kuttu Varisai
Mardani khel
Silambam
Silambam Asia
Tahtib
Thang-ta
Varma kalai
World Silambam Association

References

External links
 Official Silambam Asia
 Official World Silambam Association

Indian martial arts
Dravidian martial arts
Tamil martial arts
Stick-fighting
Tamil culture
Martial arts organizations
Martial arts governing bodies
Sports organizations of Asia
Sports governing bodies in Asia